Billy Arnold Muffett (September 21, 1930 – June 15, 2008) was an American professional baseball player and coach. He pitched in the Major Leagues for all or parts of six seasons (1957–1962) for the St. Louis Cardinals, San Francisco Giants and Boston Red Sox. He was born in Hammond, Indiana.

Beginning his professional career in 1949, Muffett missed the 1952 and 1953 seasons due to military service. He returned to minor league baseball in 1954.

Muffett came to the major leagues with St. Louis in 1957 and fashioned his best overall season, winning three of five decisions, posting an earned run average of 2.25 and notching eight saves. Over his career, he won 16 and lost 23 (.410) with a 4.33 ERA in 125 games. He threw seven complete games and one shutout and was credited with 15 career saves.

After retiring as a player, Muffett was a longtime MLB pitching coach for the Cardinals, California Angels and Detroit Tigers between 1967 and 1994, as well a minor league instructor. He coached on the Cardinals' 1967–68 National League pennant-winning clubs, and their 1967 World Series champion edition. He survived a bout with cancer in 1987, but continued in his role as Tiger pitching coach during his recovery.

Billy Muffett died June 15, 2008, at his home in Monroe, Louisiana.

See also
 List of St. Louis Cardinals coaches

References

External links
, or Retrosheet

   

1930 births
2008 deaths
Atlanta Crackers players
Baseball players from Indiana
Boston Red Sox players
California Angels coaches
Detroit Tigers coaches
Helena Seaporters players
Houston Buffaloes players
Macon Peaches players
Major League Baseball pitchers
Major League Baseball pitching coaches
Minneapolis Millers (baseball) players
Monroe Sports players
Omaha Cardinals players
Phoenix Giants players
Rapiños de Occidente players
Richmond Virginians (minor league) players
St. Louis Cardinals coaches
St. Louis Cardinals players
San Francisco Giants players
Seattle Rainiers players
Shreveport Sports players
Sportspeople from Hammond, Indiana
Sportspeople from Monroe, Louisiana
Tulsa Oilers (baseball) players
American expatriate baseball people in the Dominican Republic
American expatriate baseball players in Venezuela